Three Rivers Conference may refer to:

Three Rivers Conference (Illinois), USA; school sports conferences
Three Rivers Conference (Indiana), USA; school sports conferences
Three Rivers Conference (Minnesota) 
Three Rivers Conference (Ohio)

Other uses
 Three Rivers District (VHSL), Virginia, USA; a school sports conference

See also
 Three Rivers (disambiguation)
 Three Rivers School District (disambiguation)